Piranha is a CD released by the Fullerton College Jazz Band and Alternative Jazz Lab Ensemble in 2000, it was critically acclaimed by All About Jazz.

Background 
In 1981 the Music Department at Fullerton College built a 16 track in house recording facility which was to serve as a teaching tool for both student music groups  and students wanting to take recording technology classes at a vocational level.  By 1999, when the CD Piranha was produced, there has been several award winning recordings such as Time Tripping coming from the Fullerton College Jazz Band.    The group has been the recipient of numerous Down Beat and NARAS awards and the CDs are distributed worldwide.

During this time period the group was selected as the winner for the first ten-day Disney World/International Association for Jazz Education competition for College and University bands; the Fullerton College Jazz Band #1 performed at Disney World in Orlando during the inaugural concerts.  After a two-week tour for the U.S. State Department, they opened the 1995 Munich International Jazz Festival.

Track listing

Recording Sessions 
 recorded 1999 in studio, Fullerton College, Fullerton, California

Reception 

"Saying a piranha is combative is somewhat like observing that the late Vince Lombardi was rather fond of winning. The newest release by Fullerton College’s Jazz Ensemble 1 and Alternative Jazz Lab Ensemble is exceedingly well–named, as both groups are ready to rumble from the outset and breathe fire throughout a galvanizing session  original compositions..."

Jack Bowers, All About Jazz

References

External links

 Official website

2000 albums
Fullerton College Jazz Band albums